Lavigeria nassa is a species of tropical freshwater snail with a gill and an operculum, aquatic gastropod mollusc in the family Paludomidae.

This species is found in Burundi, the Democratic Republic of the Congo, Tanzania, and Zambia. Its natural habitat is freshwater lakes.

References

Paludomidae
Gastropods described in 1859
Taxonomy articles created by Polbot